La Romana is a municipality and capital of the southeastern province of La Romana, opposite Catalina Island. It is one of the 10 largest cities in the Dominican Republic with a population estimated in 2010 at 130,426 within the city limits (metropolitan population: 214,109), of whom 127,623 are urban and 2,803 are rural.  The name Romana comes from the word "Bomana", a name given by Indians to what is known today as Romana River.

The modern La Romana International Airport was opened in 2000. The city is near several other cities, such as San Pedro de Macorís and the national capital, Santo Domingo de Guzmán. The city is a hub for a growing tourist industry with several nearby local resort spots, such as the beachfront Bayahibe, Dominicus, Casa de Campo, and the growing number of golf resorts that surround the area.

History
The city of La Romana was officially founded in 1897 as an oil town. After 1917 with the construction of a large sugar-mill the economy quickly shifted to sugar production. The commissioning of the sugar mill coincided with the rise in sugar prices worldwide, prompting the sugar industry to welcome workers from different parts of the country as well as other parts of the Caribbean, many families moved to La Romana for economic opportunities.

In early 1960, Gulf and Western Industries, Inc. purchased the sugar mill and started to invest in the livestock industry which was cemented in the province. Meanwhile, $20 million were invested to rebuild La Romana and build schools, clinics, housing and other infrastructure for workers. During the mid-1970s the American conglomerate began selling its Dominican assets, and at the same time built what is now one of the largest exclusive tourist resorts in the Dominican Republic, Casa de Campo.

Economy

La Romana has historically been a company town, with the Central Romana Corporation owning the majority of the town. It is a town with nearly 100% employment, mostly in the tourism industry or with The Central Romana Corporation, the Duty Free Zone (Zona Franca Romana), or one of the service businesses there.

La Romana has been a one-company town since the South Puerto Rico Sugar Company built the mammoth Central Romana mill in 1917. It was the only sugar operation not taken over by Rafael Trujillo during his reign. From 1964 to 1967, the South Puerto Rico Sugar Company, including properties in Florida, Puerto Rico and the Dominican Republic became part of the conglomerate Gulf+Western. In 1984, the Gulf+Western Corporation sold their stake in the Central Romana Corporation to a group of local and foreign investors which includes the Fanjul brothers.
 
Gulf+Western acquired Consolidated Cigar in 1968 and shifted the Canary Island cigar-making operation to its Tabacalera de Garcia tobacco plant in La Romana. The Tabacalera de Garcia factory is currently one of the largest cigar factories in the world, and has been owned by the biggest cigar marketing company in the world, Altadis, since 1999. Three world-famous brands are produced in La Romana: Montecristo, H. Upmann, and Romeo y Julieta.

Tourism 

Casa de Campo resort complex is the flagship of the La Romana All Inclusive Resorts area. Built in 1975 by Gulf+Western to be the premiere destination in the Caribbean, it has lived up to the hype. In 1984 Casa de Campo was purchased by the Central Romana Corporation which is co-owned by the Fanjul brothers.

Altos de Chavón is a reconstruction of a 16th-century Mediterranean village located just minutes from La Romana.

Casa de Campo International Tourist Port (Muelle Turístico Internacional Casa de Campo), located on the West Bank of La Romana River or Rio Dulce, has  been utilized primarily for the docking of commercial ships, primarily for the transport of sugar and molasses. Upon exceeding the capacity of its port, the Central Romana Corporation built its new tourism focused port on the east side of the river.

The port is a modern platform and harbor terminal, with a capacity for two large modern cruise ships. Today the new facilities boast two docking platforms (East Dock:  in length, West Dock:  in length), a  passenger terminal and parking facilities which accommodate 24 buses.

La Romana International Airport (IATA: LRM, ICAO: MDLR) is a private commercial airport in the east of the Dominican Republic, serving the resort town of La Romana and the resort of Casa de Campo. It was built in a traditional Dominican style, with open-air terminals.

There is a significant number of charter lines and flights to La Romana; this airport registered a large influx of visitors in 2002, making it one of the most visited airports in the Dominican Republic.

It currently ranks fifth in air traffic, behind Punta Cana, Las Américas, Puerto Plata and Santiago. The airport receives many international airlines. The airport has 7 positions in the international terminal and a spacious private aviation terminal where up to 12 private jets can be parked.

Climate
La Romana has a tropical savanna climate (Köppen Aw) only slightly above a hot semi-arid climate (BSh) due to its shielded location from the northeasterly trade winds.

Sports
Estadio Francisco Micheli is home to the Toros del Este, a baseball team in the Dominican Winter League.

In 1983, the government of Salvador Jorge Blanco, through the fund for development of this region, built the Polideportivo de La Romana (La Romana Sports Center), which was named after Eleoncio Mercedes in honor of the flyweight boxer who became world champion. The Cañeros de La Romana, a Dominican basketball team, play their home games here.

Population
 1981 : 91,571
 1993 : 140,200
 2004 : 171,500
 2012 : 227,856

Notable people

 Fernando Abad Major League Baseball pitcher for the Boston Red Sox
 Antonio Alfonseca pitched for the Philadelphia Phillies
 Juana Arrendel high jumper
 Miguel Castro - baseball pitcher for the Baltimore Orioles
 Andújar Cedeño former MLB shortstop
 Domingo Cedeño former MLB infielder
 Rafael Dolis relief pitcher for the Toronto Blue Jays.
 Edwin Encarnación first baseman for the Cleveland Indians.
 Pedro Florimón shortstop for the Pittsburgh Pirates
 Freddy García former MLB infielder
 Tito Horford retired professional basketball player
 Luis Ernesto José lightweight boxer
 Eleoncio Mercedes former world champion boxer in the Flyweight division
 Yermín Mercedes, catcher/designated hitter for the San Francisco Giants
 Ramon Rijo A.K.A. "MONCHY," singer, Musician, songwriter and Musical Producer, Monchy y Alexandra
 John Nolasco featherweight boxer
 Pedro Julio Nolasco professional boxer & Winner of Dominican Republics first ever Olympic medal (bronze), during the 1984 Summer Olympics. Silver medalist at the 83 Pan American Games. Shot and killed in 95.
 Arismendy Peguero sprinter who specializes in the 400 metres.
 Félix Pie center fielder for the Hanwha Eagles
 Danny Richar second baseman for the Chicago White Sox
 Luis Santana retired professional boxer
 Rafael Santana former MLB shortstop
 Julian Yan retired professional baseball player
 Edison Azcona professional footballer who plays for Inter Miami

References 

 
Populated places in La Romana Province
Municipalities of the Dominican Republic